Métamorphose is first studio album by French heavy metal band Sortilège released in 1984. It was the first album released by Madrigal. In 1997 Madrigal re-released this album with English versions of Majesté, Légende, Civilisation Perdue, Cyclope De L'etang and Métamorphose as bonus tracks.

History 
Following the success of their debut EP, Sortilège signed a new contract with the French record label Madrigal, however, they didn't want to wait for the goodwill of their label, so they went to Germany in order to record new album, Métamorphose. An important choice for Sortilège. Through their contacts in Germany they recorded an English version at the same time and released album in many countries, including Japan. The success was soon to go and Sortilège was undoubtedly one of the main leaders of the French heavy metal scene. Métamorphose continues the success of their previous release.

Musically, Métamorphose improved their musical style. The production improved, all instruments were audible, this impression is greatly enhanced by the excellent remastering of this album in 1997. Above all, Sortilège hardens tone. Less extensive and conclusive than the first EP, Zouille is much more aggressive and vindictive. Riffs were hardened and they became even more melodic. Lyrics were still based on fantasy. Sadly, since Augustin's singing on English wasn't as good as on French, English version haven't sold at all anywhere except in Japan.

Videos were made for songs D'ailleurs and Métamorphose. Song Le Cyclope De l’Etang from this album is on the compilation album Metal Warriors (released by Ebony Records), a best-of best songs of heavy-metal circuit in the 80s. This song also appears on a compilation album Raise Your Axe - Le sampler collector d'Axe Killer a various artist compilation album published by Axe Killer.

Song Métamorphose from this album, alongside songs from other artists, including Slayer, Metallica, Trouble and Venom, appears on a compilation album Banzai Axe published by Banzai Records

Track listing

Re-release bonus tracks

Personnel 
 Christian Augustin - vocals
 Stéphane Dumont - lead guitar
 Didier Demajean - rhythm guitar
 Daniel Lapp - bass
 Bob Dumont - drums

External links
 http://metal.nightfall.fr/index_609_sortilege-metamorphose-1984.html

1984 albums
Sortilège (band) albums